Thorvald Hansen was a Norwegian nordic combined skier who won the event at the Holmenkollen ski festival in 1905 and 1909. For being the first two-time Nordic combined winner, Hansen earned the Holmenkollen medal in 1909.

References
Holmenkollen medalists - click Holmenkollmedaljen for downloadable pdf file 
Holmenkollen winners since 1892 - click Vinnere for downloadable pdf file 

Holmenkollen medalists
Holmenkollen Ski Festival winners
Norwegian male Nordic combined skiers
Year of birth missing
Year of death missing
20th-century Norwegian people